Lagarde-d'Apt (literally Lagarde of Apt) is a commune in the Vaucluse department in the Provence-Alpes-Côte d'Azur region in southeastern France.

It is a local centre for lavender distilling for the perfume trade, containing two lavender distilleries. The town is also the home of the famous Chevredou cheese shop.

At 1100 m above sea level, the village is the highest point in the Apt region, and with its setting in hills and lavender fields, is a local centre for the hiking industry.

See also
 Luberon
Communes of the Vaucluse department

References

Communes of Vaucluse